Prof. Carl Folke (born 1955), is a trans-disciplinary environmental scientist and a member of the Royal Swedish Academy of Sciences. He is a  specialist in economics, resilience, and social-ecological systems. He is Science Director of the Stockholm Resilience Centre and the Director of the Beijer Institute of Ecological Economics of the Royal Swedish Academy of Sciences.

Biography
Folke earned his Ph.D. in 1990 in ecological economics/Natural Resource Management from the Department of Systems Ecology, Stockholm University, Stockholm, Sweden under the supervision of Professor AnnMari Jansson. He continued his career in Stockholm working for both Stockholm University and the Beijer Institute in a number of leadership role.

He was elected member of the Royal Swedish Academy of Sciences in 2002 and serves on its Environmental Research Committee. He is among the founders of the Resilience Alliance. He was involved in the development of the International Society for Ecological Economics and contributed to Millennium Ecosystem Assessment.

Publications (selection)
Folke has co-authored and edited 10 books and written over 200 scientific papers, over 15 of which have been published in Science and Nature.  Since 2002 he has served as Co-Editor in Chief of Ecology and Society.

Books
Chapin, Kofinas, Folke (Eds.), Principles of Natural Resource Stewardship: Resilience-Based Management in a Changing World, Springer 2009, .
Berkes, Colding, Folke (Eds.), Navigating Social-Ecological Systems: Building Resilience for Complexity and Change. Cambridge University Press 2003, .
Berkes, Folke (Eds.), Linking Social and Ecological Systems: Management Practices and Social Mechanisms for Building Resilience. Cambridge University Press 1998, .
Andersson, Folke, Nyström, Trading with the Environment: Ecology, Economics, Institutions, and Policy Earthscan 1995, .

Important journal papers
Steffen et al., Planetary boundaries: Guiding human development on a changing planet. In: Science 347, No. 6223, (2015), .
Folke et al., Reconnecting to the Biosphere. In: Ambio 40, Issue 7, (2011), 719–738, .
Steffen et al., The Anthropocene: From Global Change to Planetary Stewardship. In: Ambio 40, Issue 7, (2011), 739–761, .
Folke et al., Resilience Thinking: Integrating Resilience, Adaptability and Transformability. In: Ecology and Society 15, Issue 4, (2010), Link.
Rockström et al., A safe operating space for humanity. In: Nature 461, (2009), 472–475, .
Liu et al., Complexity of Coupled Human and Natural Systems. In: Science 317, No. 5844, (2007), 1513–1516, .
Worm et al., Impacts of Biodiversity Loss on Ocean Ecosystem Services. In: Science 314, No. 5800, (2006), 787-790, . 
Folke, Resilience: The emergence of a perspective for social–ecological systems analyses. In: Global Environmental Change 16, Issue 3, (2006), 253–267, .
Folke et al., Adaptive governance of social-ecological systems. In: Annual Review of Environment and Resources 30, (2005), 441–473, .
Hughes et al., Climate Change, Human Impacts, and the Resilience of Coral Reefs. In: Science 301, No. 5635, (2003), 929–933, .
Folke et al., Resilience and Sustainable Development: Building Adaptive Capacity in a World of Transformations. In: Ambio 31, Issue 5, (2002), 437–440, .
Scheffer et al., Catastrophic shifts in ecosystems. In: Nature 413, (2001), 591–596, .
Arrow et al., Economic growth, carrying capacity, and the environment. In: Ecological Economics 15, Issue 2 (1995), 91–95, .

Awards and recognition
In 2017 he was awarded Gunnerus Sustainability Award by the Royal Norwegian Society of Sciences and Letters.

References

External links
Beijer Institute of Ecological Economics
Website of the Stockholm Resilience Center
CV
publication list

Interview with Carl Folke in Science Watch

Living people
1955 births
Swedish biologists
Systems ecologists
Ecological economists
Members of the Royal Swedish Academy of Sciences
Foreign associates of the National Academy of Sciences